Comet Olbers may refer to:
 13P/Olbers (a.k.a. 13P/1815 E1, 13P/1887 Q1, 1887 V, 1887f, 13P/1956 A1, 1956 IV, 1956a), a periodic comet with an orbital period of 69 years
 C/1796 F1
 A partial reference to C/1780 U1, Comet Montaigne-Olbers (a.k.a. 1780 II)